Thelning is a surname. Notable people with the surname include:

Åke Thelning (1892–1979), Swedish Army officer and horse rider
Emanuel Thelning (1767–1831), Swedish-born, Finnish painter

Surnames of Scandinavian origin